The Estádio Flamarion Vasconcelos, known as the Canarinho, is a football stadium located in the city of Boa Vista, Roraima, Brazil. The stadium is owned by the state of Roraima.

The ground was opened on 6 September 1975 and was initially known as Estádio 13 de Setembro. It was subsequently renamed after Flamarion Vasconcelos, a journalist from Roraima. It is known as the Canarinho, after the neighbourhood in which the stadium is located.

Renovation
Work to expand the stadium began in the first half of 2012. The cost of the project was expected to cost .

Notes

References

Boa Vista, Roraima
Vasconcelos